FC Tori (Georgian: საფეხბურთო კლუბი თორი) is a Georgian football club based in Borjomi. 

They completed five seasons in lower leagues of Georgian football system and started participating in Regionuli Liga East Group in 2021, but after twelve matches withdrew from the tournament.

History 
The first football club, emerged in Borjomi in 1936, for many years participated in Georgian regional championship under the names Borjomi or Tori and later, between 2005 and 2009, in Umaglesi Liga as FC Borjomi.

While FC Borjomi represented the city in Liga 2, in July 2016 FC Tori was officially established by veteran football players on the basis of Borjomi Sport School. They started competing in Meore Liga, the third division of Georgian league system, in 2016 when the Georgian Football Federation decided to switch back to Spring-Autumn system and with this aim organized a shortened transitional tournament.  

The next four seasons Tori spent in Regionuli Liga, initially the fourth division, which became the fifth tier following the creation of Liga 4 in 2019.

In 2020 the team finished in the 11th place among 14 clubs. The next year a severe financial crisis hit Tori, which resulted in their withdrawal from the league.

Seasons

Stadium
The club hosts home games at Jemal Zeinklishvili stadium, which is shared with FC Borjomi.

In September 2020 the City Hall of Borjomi announced that the football ground would undergo some reconstruction works next year.

Derby
With FC Borjomi competing in an upper league, the two teams of the city have never encountered in any recent regular season. However, in March 2019 their paths converged in II round of David Kipiani Cup. En route to this game Tori had prevailed over Meskheti and Chkherimela with an aggregate 18-0 score, but they suffered a defeat in the derby and crashed out of the tournament.

External links
 On Soccerway
 On Facebook

References

Tori
2016 establishments in Georgia (country)
Association football clubs established in 2016